Sibiril is a commune in the Finistère department of Brittany in north-western France.

Geography

Climate
Sibiril has a oceanic climate (Köppen climate classification Cfb).

Population
Inhabitants of Sibiril are called in French Sibirilois.

See also
Communes of the Finistère department
List of works of the two Folgoët ateliers

References

External links

Mayors of Finistère Association 

Communes of Finistère